The Man Who Was Sherlock Holmes (German: Der Mann, der Sherlock Holmes war) is a 1937 German mystery comedy film directed by Karl Hartl and starring Hans Albers, Heinz Rühmann and Marieluise Claudius.

The film's sets were designed by the art director Otto Hunte and Willy Schiller. It was shot at the Babelsberg Studios in Berlin.

Plot 

Detective Morris Flynn (Hans Albers) and his assistant Macky McMacpherson (Heinz Rühmann), masquereading as Sherlock Holmes and Dr Watson, investigate two attractive sisters, Mary and Jane Berry, and the theft and forgery of valuable postage stamps.

Reception 
Lexikon des Internationalen Films calls it a swinging, lively comedy. Albers and Rühmann have been two longtime major stars of German cinema and are still known for the main song in this movie, Jawoll, meine Herr'n.

Release
The Man Who Was Sherlock Holmes was released on DVD on 24 March 2009.

Cast

References

Bibliography
 R. A. Stemmle: Der Mann, der Sherlock Holmes war. Roman nach dem gleichnamigen Film von R. A. Stemmle und Karl Hartl. Droemer Knaur, München / Zürich 1981, 
 Michael Ross (Hrsg.): Sherlock Holmes in Film und Fernsehen. Ein Handbuch. Baskerville Bücher, Cologne 2003,

External links
 
 

1937 films
Films of Nazi Germany
1930s German-language films
Sherlock Holmes films
Films set in Paris
Films set in 1910
Films directed by Karl Hartl
Films about con artists
UFA GmbH films
German historical comedy films
1930s historical comedy films
Films shot at Babelsberg Studios
German black-and-white films
1937 comedy films
1930s German films